The Roosevelt Apartment Building is an historic structure located in the Capitol Hill neighborhood in the Northeast quadrant of Washington, D.C.

The building is a multiple-family double row-house that was built as a middle-class dwelling. C. Graham, & Son designed the Late Victorian building, which was completed in 1898.

The structure exemplifies apartment building evolution from the vernacular row-house form.  It was listed on the National Register of Historic Places in 1994.

References

Residential buildings completed in 1898
Apartment buildings in Washington, D.C.
Victorian architecture in Washington, D.C.
Residential buildings on the National Register of Historic Places in Washington, D.C.